Morozovo is a rural locality (a village) in Annenskoye Rural Settlement, Vytegorsky District, Vologda Oblast, Russia. The population was 7 as of 2002.

Geography 
Morozovo is located 66 km southeast of Vytegra (the district's administrative centre) by road. Bessonovo is the nearest rural locality.

References 

Rural localities in Vytegorsky District